Oscar Lee Britt (June 18, 1919 – December 13, 1992) was an American football guard in the National Football League for the Washington Redskins.  He played college football at the University of Mississippi and was drafted in the 14th round of the 1943 NFL Draft. Oscars pro football contract was for $225,00 a game, an original Leatherhead player.

Personal life
Oscar married in 1949 and has six children. All of the children are living as of 2013.

External links

1919 births
1992 deaths
People from Brookhaven, Mississippi
Players of American football from Mississippi
American football offensive guards
Ole Miss Rebels football players
Washington Redskins players
United States Marine Corps personnel of World War II
United States Marine Corps officers